1923 in sports describes the year's events in world sport.

American football
NFL championship
 Canton Bulldogs (11–0–1)
College championship
 Illinois Fighting Illini – college football national championship

Association football
Bulgaria
 Formation of the Bulgarian Football Union (BFU)
England
 The Football League – Liverpool 60 points, Sunderland 54, Huddersfield Town 53, Newcastle United 48, Everton 47, Aston Villa 46
 FA Cup final – Bolton Wanderers 2–0 West Ham United at Empire Stadium, Wembley, London.  The match, known as the "White Horse Final", is the inaugural Wembley final.
 The Third Division North expands from 20 to 22 clubs, bringing the total number of Football League clubs to 88. With Stalybridge Celtic expelled, the new clubs are Doncaster Rovers, New Brighton (1923–1951) and Bournemouth & Boscombe Athletic.
Germany
 National Championship – Hamburger SV 3–0 Union Oberschöneweide at Berlin 
Romania
 Rapid București is founded under the name "Cultural and Sporting Association CFR" (in Romanian: Asociatia culturala si sportiva C.F.R.) by a group of workers at the Grivita workshops.
Spain
 Celta de Vigo is founded after the merger of Real Vigo Sporting and Real Club Fortuna de Vigo.
 Club Deportivo Villarreal, official founded on March 10, as predecessor for Villarreal CF.
Turkey
 Formation of the Turkish Football Federation (Türkiye Futbol Federasyonu or TFF)
 Genclerbirligi of Ankara officially founded on March 14.

Athletics
Monaco
 third Women's Olympiad in Monte Carlo

UK
 First British Track & Field championships for women, London

US
 First American Track & Field championships for women, New Jersey

Australian rules football
VFL Premiership
 13 October – Essendon wins the 27th VFL Premiership, defeating Fitzroy 8.15 (63) to 6.10 (46) at Melbourne Cricket Ground (MCG) in the 1923 VFL Grand Final.
South Australian Football League
 29 September – Norwood 9.12 (66) defeats North Adelaide 6.4 (40) to win its second successive SAFL premiership
 Magarey Medal won by Horrie Riley (Sturt)
West Australian Football League
 6 October – East Perth win its fifth consecutive premiership, beating East Fremantle 9.9 (63) to 7.4 (46)
 Sandover Medal won by "Digger" Thomas (East Perth)

Bandy
Sweden
 Championship final – Västerås SK 2-1 IF Linnéa

Baseball
World Series
 10–15 October — New York Yankees (AL) defeats New York Giants (NL) to win the 1923 World Series by 4 games to 2
Major League Baseball
 18 April — opening of the original Yankee Stadium in the Bronx
Negro leagues
 The Eastern Colored League (ECL) plays its first season with six teams: Hilldale Daisies, Brooklyn Royal Giants, Cuban Stars (East), New York Lincoln Giants, Atlantic City Bacharach Giants, and Baltimore Black Sox. Hilldale wins the first pennant. Afterward the league votes for expansion to eight teams, accepting the Harrisburg Giants and the Washington Potomacs.
 The Negro National League completes its fourth season with the Kansas City Monarchs winning their first pennant after three years of domination by Rube Foster's Chicago American Giants. The other teams in the league are Indianapolis ABC's, Detroit Stars, St. Louis Stars, Cuban Stars (West), Toledo Tigers, and Milwaukee Bears. The Tigers and Bears disband during the season and three teams play under "associate" status for the remainder of the season: Cleveland Tate Stars, Birmingham Black Barons, and Memphis Red Sox.
 Oscar "Heavy" Johnson wins the NNL triple crown, leading in batting average, home runs, and RBI, while Wilbur "Bullet" Rogan leads in wins and strikeouts. Raleigh "Biz" Mackey is the batting leader in the ECL with Jesse "Nip" Winters leading in most pitching categories.
 There is no World Series between the two champions this year, owing to enmity between Rube Foster and the ECL president Ed Bolden

Boxing
Events
 18 June — Jimmy Wilde's long reign as World Flyweight Champion ends when he is knocked out by Filipino Pancho Villa in the 7th round in New York City 
 31 August — Harry Greb, arguably the greatest-ever middleweight, takes the world title when he defeats Johnny Wilson over 15 rounds in New York City 
 14 September — Jack Dempsey knocks out Luis Firpo in the second round of a sensational fight at the Polo Grounds in New York City to retain his World Heavyweight Championship title.
Lineal world champions
 World Heavyweight Championship – Jack Dempsey
 World Light Heavyweight Championship – Battling Siki → Mike McTigue
 World Middleweight Championship – Johnny Wilson → Harry Greb
 World Welterweight Championship – Mickey Walker
 World Lightweight Championship – Benny Leonard
 World Featherweight Championship – Johnny Kilbane → Eugene Criqui → Johnny Dundee
 World Bantamweight Championship – Joe Lynch
 World Flyweight Championship – Jimmy Wilde → Pancho Villa

Canadian football
Grey Cup
 11th Grey Cup in the Canadian Football League – Queen's University 54–0 Regina Roughriders

Cricket
Events
 In a cool, damp English summer, a West Indian team is on tour, winning six and losing seven first-class matches.
England
 County Championship – Yorkshire
 Minor Counties Championship – Buckinghamshire
 Most runs – Patsy Hendren 2934 @ 77.21 (HS 200*)
 Most wickets – Maurice Tate 219 @ 13.97 (BB 8–30)
 Wisden Cricketers of the Year – Arthur Gilligan, Roy Kilner, George Macaulay, Cec Parkin, Maurice Tate
Australia
 Sheffield Shield – New South Wales
 Most runs – Percy Chapman 782 @ 65.16 (HS 134*)
 Most wickets – Arthur Mailey 55 @ 21.58 (BB 6–45)
India
 Bombay Quadrangular – Parsees
New Zealand
 Plunket Shield – Canterbury
South Africa
 Currie Cup – not contested
West Indies
 Inter-Colonial Tournament – not contested

Cycling
Tour de France
 Henri Pélissier (France) wins the 17th Tour de France
Giro d'Italia
 Costante Girardengo of Maino wins the eleventh Giro d'Italia

Figure skating
World Figure Skating Championships
 World Men's Champion – Fritz Kachler (Austria)
 World Women's Champion – Herma Szabo (Austria)
 World Pairs Champions – Ludowika Jakobsson-Eilers and Walter Jakobsson (Finland)

Golf
Major tournaments
 British Open – Arthur Havers
 US Open – Bobby Jones
 USPGA Championship – Gene Sarazen
Other tournaments
 British Amateur – Roger Wethered
 US Amateur – Max Marston

Horse racing
England
 Grand National – Sergeant Murphy
 1,000 Guineas Stakes – Tranquil
 2,000 Guineas Stakes – Ellangowan
 The Derby – Papyrus
 The Oaks – Brownhylda
 St. Leger Stakes – Tranquil
Australia
 Melbourne Cup – Bitalli
Canada
 King's Plate – Flowerful
France
 Prix de l'Arc de Triomphe – Parth
Ireland
 Irish Grand National – Be Careful
 Irish Derby Stakes – Waygood 
USA
 Kentucky Derby – Zev
 Preakness Stakes – Vigil
 Belmont Stakes – Zev

Ice hockey
Stanley Cup
 29–31 March — Ottawa Senators wins the Stanley Cup for the fifth time, defeating the Edmonton Eskimos by 2 games to 0 in the 1923 Stanley Cup Finals
Sweden
 Klass I, a professional ice hockey league in Sweden, as predecessor for Swedish Hockey League, first officially game held on January 23.

Motorsport

Multi-sport events
Far Eastern Championship Games
 The 6th Far Eastern Championship Games is held at Osaka, Japan.

Rowing
The Boat Race
 24 March — Oxford wins the 75th Oxford and Cambridge Boat Race

Rugby league
England
 Championship – Hull Kingston Rovers
 Challenge Cup final – Leeds 28–3 Hull F.C. at Belle Vue, Wakefield 
 Lancashire League Championship – Wigan
 Yorkshire League Championship – Hull
 Lancashire County Cup – Wigan 20–2 Leigh 
 Yorkshire County Cup – York 5–0 Batley
Australia
 NSW Premiership – Eastern Suburbs 15–12 South Sydney (grand final)

Rugby union
Five Nations Championship
 36th Five Nations Championship series is won by England who complete the Grand Slam.

Speed skating
Speed Skating World Championships
 Men's All-round Champion – Clas Thunberg (Finland)

Tennis
Australia
 Australian Men's Singles Championship – Pat O'Hara Wood (Australia) defeats Bert St. John (Australia) 6–1 6–1 6–3
 Australian Women's Singles Championship – Margaret Molesworth (Australia) defeats Esna Boyd Robertson (Australia) 6–1 7–5
England
 Wimbledon Men's Singles Championship – Bill Johnston (USA) defeats Francis Hunter (USA) 6–0 6–3 6–1
 Wimbledon Women's Singles Championship – Suzanne Lenglen (France) defeats Kitty McKane Godfree (Great Britain) 6–2 6–2
France
 French Men's Singles Championship – François Blanchy (France) defeats Max Decugis (France) 1–6 6–2 6–0 6–2 
 French Women's Singles Championship – Suzanne Lenglen (France) defeats Germaine Golding (France) 6–1 6–4
USA
 American Men's Singles Championship – Bill Tilden (USA) defeats Bill Johnston (USA) 6–4 6–1 6–4
 American Women's Singles Championship – Helen Wills Moody (USA) defeats Molla Bjurstedt Mallory (Norway) 6–2 6–1
Davis Cup
 1923 International Lawn Tennis Challenge –  4–1  at West Side Tennis Club (grass) New York City, United States

Notes
The Grand Final was postponed owing to heavy rain, creating the latest finish to a VFL/AFL season.

References

 
Sports by year